The 1971 National Indoor Championships, also known as the Hampton Indoor, was a men's tennis tournament played on indoor carpet courts at the Hampton Roads Coliseum in Hampton, Virginia in the United States that was part of the 1971 USLTA Indoor Circuit. It was the second edition of the tournament and was held  from March 1 through March 7, 1971. First-seeded Ilie Năstase won the singles title and earned $10,000 first-prize money.

Finals

Singles

 Ilie Năstase defeated  Clark Graebner 7–5, 6–4, 7–6(5–0)
 It was Năstase's 3rd singles title of the year and the 7th of his career.

Doubles

 Ilie Năstase /  Ion Ţiriac defeated  Clark Graebner /  Thomaz Koch 6–4, 4–6, 7–5

See also
 1971 U.S. Professional Indoor

References

External links
 ITF tournament edition details

National Indoor Championships
National Indoor Championships
National Indoor Championships
1971 in sports in Virginia